Lecoanet Hemant (founded in 1981) is a fashion label, founded by Didier Lecoanet and Hemant Sagar. The label initially was based in  Rue du Faubourg Saint-Honoré, Paris and focussed only on haute couture designs. However, the label has transitioned the focus to ready-to-wear and has moved their base to Gurugram, India.

History
Hemant and Lecoanet met in Paris, France, at the Ecole de la Chambre Syndicale de la Couture Parisienne. Both of them were learning Haute Couture at that time and decided to launch something together. They started a store in Paris and were one amongst only 24 Haute Couture Houses. They eventually became a part of the Haute Couture Club and also joined  Syndicat as a member. They presented their collections in various international events and later decided to move to India to launch two new brands namely GENES and Ayurganic.

Notable clients
 Princess Noor Bint Badr 
Ranveer Singh
Rashi Khanna
Ananya Raje Scindia

Awards, collections and collaborations
Collection present at Victoria and Albert Museum, London
Collection present at the Mikimoto Museum in Honshu, Japan 
Collection present at the Ariana in Geneva
Collection present at Galleria Museum of Fashion, Paris
Miami Fashion Week, 2007

References

1981 establishments in Haryana
Clothing companies established in 1981

Indian companies established in 1981
Companies based in Paris
Companies based in Gurgaon
Clothing companies of France
Clothing companies of India
French fashion designers
Indian fashion designers
Haute couture